The Namib long-eared bat (Laephotis namibensis) is a species of vesper bat in the family Vespertilionidae found in Namibia. It is found in dry savanna and temperate desert.

References

Mammals described in 1971
Laephotis
Taxonomy articles created by Polbot
Bats of Africa